CONCACAF (Confederation of North, Central American and Caribbean Association Football) announced on 30 May 2007 the final rosters for all twelve teams that will compete in the 2007 CONCACAF Gold Cup. The roster for each team consists of 23 players, as stipulated in the CONCACAF Gold Cup Tournament Rules and Regulations. A listed player may only be substituted in the event of a serious injury up until 24 hours before the team's first match at the 2007 CONCACAF Gold Cup.

Below the squad lists of the teams participating in the 2007 CONCACAF Gold Cup.

Group A

Canada

Head coach:  Stephen Hart

Costa Rica

Head coach:  Hernán Medford

Guadeloupe

Head coach:  Roger Salnot

Haiti

Head coach:  Luis Armelio García

Group B

El Salvador

Head coach:  Carlos de los Cobos

Guatemala

Head coach:  Hernán Darío Gómez

Trinidad and Tobago

Head coach:  Wim Rijsbergen

 With the exception of Densill Theobald, The players who participated in the 2006 FIFA World Cup boycotted the national team because they had yet to get their World Cup bonuses paid.

United States

Head coach:  Bob Bradley

Group C

Cuba

Head coach:  Raúl González Triana

 * Defected the team after Gold Cup match against Panama

Honduras

Head coach:  Reynaldo Rueda

Mexico

Head coach:  Hugo Sánchez

Panama

Head coach:  Alexandre Guimarães

External links
Official Site
Gold Cup 2007 at RSSSF

CONCACAF Gold Cup squads
2007 CONCACAF Gold Cup